Adam Edward Vrooman (November 7, 1847 – August 20, 1923) was an Ontario physician and political figure. He represented Victoria South in the House of Commons of Canada from 1900 to 1904 and Victoria West in the Legislative Assembly of Ontario from 1911 to 1914 as a Conservative member.

He was born in Brock Township, Canada West, the son of James Vrooman, and educated in Lindsay and at Trinity University, receiving his M.D. He set up practice in Little Britain, later moving to Lindsay. In 1873, he married Mary Whiteside. Vrooman ran unsuccessfully for a federal seat in 1896. He was reeve for Mariposa Township from 1890 to 1892, warden for Victoria County in 1892 and mayor of Lindsay from 1906 to 1907. Vrooman also served as Medical Officer of Health for the township.

External links 

Victoria County centennial history, W Kirkconnell (1921)
Mariposa, the Banner Township : a history of the Township of Mariposa ..., RW Irwin (1984)

1847 births
1923 deaths
Canadian people of Dutch descent
Conservative Party of Canada (1867–1942) MPs
Mayors of places in Ontario
Members of the House of Commons of Canada from Ontario
Progressive Conservative Party of Ontario MPPs